Tomi Saarelma (born 30 November 1988) is a Finnish footballer who plays for MYPA

His previous clubs include Chelsea FC, FC KooTeePee, 1. FC Kleve, FC Levadia, FC Baden, BSC Old Boys, SR Delémont and FC Lahti.

Club career
When Saarelma was 16, he was spotted by the scouts of English club Chelsea, playing for his youth club FC Lahti. After a successful trial with the club, Saarelma was offered a two-year contract in the beginning of 2005, and officially moved to the club in the summer of 2005. In the beginning of his Chelsea career, he formed an important part of the club's youth team and helped the team to reach the final of the famous tournament, Milk Cup, where they lost to FC Barcelona. After two seasons, Saarelma left the club, where he was highly praised for his skills with the ball, but as a small player, could not really cope with the physical side of the game, which is an important part of the English football.

In 2008 Saarelma returned to Finland and signed a two-year contract with FC KooTeePee of the Veikkausliiga, the highest level of football in Finland. Saarelma was one of the key figures in the team, specially at the second part of the season, making 22 appearances and scoring two goals. After just one season Saarelma left the club and signed with the German side 1. FC Kleve, but left just after six months.

In the summer of 2009 Saarelma signed with Estonia's biggest club, FC Levadia, where he won the league title in his first season, making 19 league appearances and scoring 4 goals. Saarelma also was helping the team do well in Europe, where Levadia faced many top teams, for example Turkish side Galatasaray, who put them out of the Europa League 2009. He won the Estonian Cup and Super Cup with Levadia in 2010. Saarelma left the club before the 2011 season began and moved to Swiss 1. Liga club FC Baden. In the summer of 2012 Saarelma moved to SR Delemont In Swiss Challenge League.

On 2 September 2015, Saarelma signed for League of Ireland side Galway United FC until the end of the 2015 season. After that, he signed with FC Zürich in Switzerland in September 2017. He played for the club until August 2018, and then signed with TPS.

International career
Saarelma has represented Finland at youth international level.

Honours
 Meistriliiga 2009

References

External links
Veikkausliiga profile
KooTeePee profile
Levadia profile

1988 births
Living people
Finnish footballers
Association football midfielders
FC Lahti players
Chelsea F.C. players
FC KooTeePee players
Meistriliiga players
FCI Levadia Tallinn players
FC Baden players
Galway United F.C. players
Turun Palloseura footballers
Veikkausliiga players
FC Zürich players
Swiss Super League players
League of Ireland players
People from Hollola
Sportspeople from Päijät-Häme
Finnish expatriate footballers
Finnish expatriate sportspeople in England
Expatriate footballers in England
Finnish expatriate sportspeople in Estonia
Expatriate footballers in Estonia
Finnish expatriate sportspeople in Germany
Expatriate footballers in Germany
Expatriate association footballers in Ireland
Finnish expatriate sportspeople in Ireland
Finnish expatriate sportspeople in Switzerland
Expatriate footballers in Switzerland